Murderous City (Turkish: Öldüren Şehir) is a 1953 Turkish drama film directed by Lütfi Akad and starring Ayhan Işık, Belgin Doruk and Sevki Artun.

Cast
 Ayhan Işık as Ali  
 Belgin Doruk as Selma 
 Sevki Artun as Hikmet  
 Muazzez Arçay as Hatice  
 Nuri Beyat 
 Settar Körmükçü as Kaptan  
 Ziya Metin as Ziya Metin  
 Pola Morelli as Nesrin 
 Kenan Pars as Kenan 
 Kadir Savun 
 Turan Seyfioğlu as Sevket  
 Mualla Sürer 
 Nubar Terziyan as Osman

References

Bibliography
 Gönül Dönmez-Colin. The Routledge Dictionary of Turkish Cinema. Routledge, 2013.

External links
 

1953 films
1953 drama films
1950s Turkish-language films
Turkish drama films
Films directed by Lütfi Akad
Turkish black-and-white films